General elections were held in India in 1998 to constitute the 12th Lok Sabha, after the government led by I. K. Gujral collapsed when Indian National Congress (INC) withdrew support in November 1997. The outcome of the new elections was once again indecisive, with no party or alliance able to muster a majority. Turnout for the election was 61.97%.

BJP once again wins Nineteen seats but Congress also wins seven-seat out of a total of twenty-six seats.

Party-wise results summary

Results- Constituency wise

References

Indian general elections in Gujarat
1998 Indian general election
1990s in Gujarat